Minna Rose Fernald (1860–1954) was an American botanical artist. Her subjects were mainly landscapes and wildflowers. She received awards for her art and also a medal for work with the Red Cross during World War 1.

She was born Minna Rose Simon in Baltimore in 1860 and was a relative of the botanist Merritt Fernald. She lived initially in Maryland and then briefly in Pensylvannia but spent most of her life in Massachusetts. After education in Germany she trained at the Maryland Institute under Hugh Newell of the American Watercolor Society. Fernald’s work was exhibited in Amherst, Massachusetts. She accompanied her husband (Henry Torsey Fernald, married on 9 June 1890) in moving from Massachusetts to Winter Park, Florida in 1924 when he retired.  She won many awards in the Central Florida Exposition and in exhibitions of the Florida Federation of Art. They had three children.

She donated her watercolors to the University of Florida Herbarium in 1942 and they are now curated at the Florida Museum of Natural History.

There are around 320 watercolors in the collection. As well as the botanical accuracy of the paintings, that required her to study in the field, they are important as a record of the native flora of Florida prior to substantial urbanization and agricultural land-use.

Fernald died in 1954.

References 

1860 births
1954 deaths
Botanical illustrators
American women botanists
American botanists
19th-century American women artists
20th-century American women artists
Artists from Florida
Artists from Maryland
American women illustrators
American illustrators
People from Winter Park, Florida
Artists from Massachusetts